Philippe Doumenc (born 21 April 1934) is a French novelist. His first novel, Les Comptoirs du Sud won the 1989 Prix Renaudot.

He is the grandson of Aimé Doumenc (1880-1948).

Works
Les Comptoirs du Sud: roman, Paris: Éditions du Seuil, 1989,  
En haut à gauche du paradis: roman, Paris: éditions du Seuil, 1992,  
Les amants de Tonnegrande: roman, Seuil, 2003,  
Contre-enquête sur la mort d'Emma Bovary, Paris: Actes Sud, 2007,  
Un tigre dans la soute: nouvelles, Actes sud, 2008,

References

External links
"Interview with Philippe Doumenc", French Book News
 http://littexpress.over-blog.net/article-28874385.html

20th-century French novelists
21st-century French novelists
Living people
1934 births
Prix Renaudot winners